During the 2013 Australian Football League (AFL) season a number of Australian rules footballers made their AFL debut with others playing their first game for a new club.

Summary

AFL debuts

Change of AFL club

References
Full listing of players who made their AFL or club debut in 2013

Australian rules football records and statistics
Australian rules football-related lists
Debut